is a private university in the city of Gifu, Gifu Prefecture, Japan.

Its name is sometimes abbreviated to Shōtoku (聖徳) or Gishōdai (岐聖大).

It has main campuses in both Gifu and nearby Hashima, as well as a junior college campus in Gifu.

Faculty
Teachers have included:
Akira Komoto

External links
 Official website 

Educational institutions established in 1972
Private universities and colleges in Japan
Buildings and structures in Gifu
Gifu Shotoku Gakuen University